Charles Stevens (December 31, 1884 – May 1, 1942) was an American wrestler. He competed in the men's freestyle bantamweight at the 1904 Summer Olympics.

References

External links
 

1884 births
1942 deaths
American male sport wrestlers
Olympic wrestlers of the United States
Wrestlers at the 1904 Summer Olympics
Place of birth missing